Gruhapravesam is a 1976 Indian Tamil-language drama film, co-produced and directed by D. Yoganand. The film stars Sivaji Ganesan, K. R. Vijaya, Sivakumar and Jaya. It was released on 10 April 1976.

Plot 
Raju and Lakshmi live with Ravi, Raju's brother in the same house. They both sacrifice everything make Raju successful in his education and career going so far as to no have children even. Ravi too loves and looks up to them. Ravi comes back after completing his education but with Uma introducing her as her lover. Though initially taken aback, seeing Uma is a good girl and a rich girl, they accede and all seems to go well until one day when they realise that Uma has bi-polar disorder and she swings between extremes. How they handle Uma without breaking up the family forms the rest of the story.

Cast 
 Sivaji Ganesan as Mechanical Benz Raju
 K. R. Vijaya as Lakshmi
 Sivakumar as Ravi
 Jaya as Uma
 Major Sundarrajan as Uma's father
 M. R. R. Vasu as Velu
 Manorama as Arulmozhi
 V. R. Thilagam as Kalyani
 Kuladeivam Rajagopal as Workshop Mechanical man
 Master Ramu as Babu
 C. I. D Sakunthala as a stage actress

Production 
Sivakumar who played Ganesan's son in earlier films enacted the role of his younger brother in this film.

Soundtrack 
The soundtrack was composed by M. S. Viswanathan, and lyrics were written by Kannadasan.

Reception 
Kanthan of Kalki likened the film to old wine in new bottle.

References

External links 
 

1970s Tamil-language films
1976 drama films
1976 films
Films directed by D. Yoganand
Films scored by M. S. Viswanathan
Indian drama films